Highland Park Senior High School is a public secondary school in Saint Paul, Minnesota, United States serving grades 9 through 12. It is located in the Highland Park neighborhood.

The school offers the International Baccalaureate program. It is a national Blue Ribbon School.  Newsweek ranked the school #973 in their "2005 List of the 1200 Top High Schools in America."

Academics 

The school has received grants from the Bush Foundation and Gates Foundation to develop the Small Learning Communities model. Motivated students in all three Communities may take International Baccalaureate courses.

Languages 
Highland Park offers a number of foreign languages, including:
 Spanish, including the secondary component of Saint Paul Public Schools' Spanish immersion program.
 French
 Mandarin Chinese, including Chinese immersion program.
 Formerly American Sign Language; ASL was offered in the connecting Highland Park Junior High School, however the language does not continue into the high school, and the immersion program for deaf students was removed in 2008.

Athletics 

Highland Park has enjoyed moderate success in its athletic program. The boys basketball team qualified for the state championship several times in the 1970s before winning the class AAAA state championship in 1999. The girls basketball team made two state tournament runs in 1985 and 1986, finishing second in the 1986 class AA state championship.

As of 2007, Highland Park had also won two conference titles for football, six for girls basketball, eight in boys basketball, four for wrestling, including three in a row from 2005 to 2007, five for baseball and one for boys hockey.  The school also boasted a soccer team that won the conference 4 straight years 2003-07. Tony Levine played wide receiver for the football team and was chosen for the Minnesota All-State team his senior year, in 1991. The Highland Park girls cross country & nordic skiing teams have also won several championships, respectively. 

The baseball team coached by Peter Brown won the Saint Paul City Conference from 2011–13 and held the second-longest winning streak in conference play in the state of Minnesota.

Campus 
 
Highland is connected to Highland Park Junior High School, a 1958 Miesian building.

Mattocks Schoolhouse is a historic landmark now used as part of Highland Park's facilities. The one room limestone building, originally called Webster School Number 9, was built in 1871. The building became part of the Saint Paul Public Schools system in 1887 and was renamed at that time. For thirty years the building served as an American Legion post before being moved to its current location in 1964 after residing one mile north of the high school. The classroom has most recently been used for Spanish classes. Mattocks Schoolhouse is "essentially a Greek Revival building with some Italianate details."

Demographics 
According to the most recent school profile, the school's current enrollment is around 1340. 36% of students are White, 22% are African American, 13% are Asian American, 22% are Hispanic American, 7% are  Multiracial and 1% are American Indian. In addition, 11% are English language learners, 8% are in Special Education programs, and 36% are eligible for the free and reduced lunch program. The student to teacher ratio is 24:1.

Notable alumni

Dick Cohen, Minnesota state senator (DFL) (1967)
Steven Greenberg, musician and record producer (1968)
Debbie Friedman, singer/songwriter (1969)
Earl Grinols, Distinguished Professor Economics (Baylor University) (1969)
Norman Bolter, former lead trombonist with the Boston Symphony Orchestra and the Boston Pops, and composer (1973) 
Jack Morris, Hall of Fame Major League Baseball pitcher (1973)
John Wasson, notable brass musician, jazz and concert band composer and arranger (1974)
Duane G. Carey, former U.S. astronaut (1975)
T.D. Mischke, radio personality (1980)
Emily Larson, Mayor of Duluth, Minnesota (1991)
Tony Levine, former head coach for the Houston Cougars football team (1991)
Eyedea, born Micheal Larsen, rapper (1999)

References

External links
 Highland Park Senior High School

High schools in Saint Paul, Minnesota
Public high schools in Minnesota
International Baccalaureate schools in Minnesota